Dębiny may refer to the following places in Poland:
Dębiny, Sępólno County in Kuyavian-Pomeranian Voivodeship (north-central Poland)
Dębiny, Toruń County in Kuyavian-Pomeranian Voivodeship (north-central Poland)
Dębiny, Lubartów County in Lublin Voivodeship (east Poland)
Dębiny, Opole Lubelskie County in Lublin Voivodeship (east Poland)
Dębiny, Przasnysz County in Masovian Voivodeship (east-central Poland)
Dębiny, Przysucha County in Masovian Voivodeship (east-central Poland)
Dębiny, Pułtusk County in Masovian Voivodeship (east-central Poland)
Dębiny, Subcarpathian Voivodeship (south-east Poland)
Dębiny, Warmian-Masurian Voivodeship (north Poland)
Dębiny, Gmina Gzy in Masovian Voivodeship (east-central Poland)

See also 
 Dębiny Osuchowskie